Mère Poulard may refer to:

 Anne Boutiaut Poulard, known as Mère Poulard (Mother Poulard), creator of l'omelette de la Mère Poulard
 La Mère Poulard, the restaurant in Mont-Saint-Michel, France, owned by Poulard and her husband